Barbara Angie Rose Baxley (January 1, 1923 – June 7, 1990) was an American actress and singer.

Early life
Barbara Baxley was born on January 1, 1923, in Porterville, California, the daughter of Emma (née Tyler) and Bert Baxley and sister to Helen Baxley. She acted for six years in productions of schools and Little Theaters before she had her first professional role.

Career
A life member of the Actors Studio, Baxley also studied acting under the tutelage of Sanford Meisner at the prestigious Neighborhood Playhouse School of the Theater in New York City. Her first film was East of Eden, where she portrayed Adam Trask's obnoxious nurse at the end of the film.

In 1961, she was nominated for a Tony Award for Best Actress (Dramatic) for her performance in the Broadway production of Tennessee Williams's comedy Period of Adjustment. She appeared in Chekhov's The Three Sisters and Neil Simon's Plaza Suite as well as the 1960s Broadway musical She Loves Me, which co-starred Jack Cassidy, Barbara Cook and Daniel Massey. She also starred in the 1976 Broadway play Best Friend.

Baxley appeared in supporting roles in many television series of the 1950s, 1960s, and 1970s. She played a wife who had her rodeo performer husband, played by Lee Van Cleef, murdered in the crime drama series Richard Diamond, Private Detective, starring David Janssen. She appeared in a 1958 Perry Mason episode, "The Case of the Gilded Lily", as Enid Griffin and she played the role of Cora Wheeler in the original Twilight Zone episode of "Mute".

Baxley played two different characters in two episodes of Have Gun – Will Travel, starring Richard Boone. She also played roles on Where the Heart Is and Another World, two daytime soap operas. She further played on an episode of The Fugitive as the one-armed man's girlfriend. She appeared in six episodes of Alfred Hitchcock Presents.

A memorable Baxley performance came in a 1973 episode of Hawaii Five-O entitled "One Big Happy Family". She portrayed the matriarch of a serial-killing Southern family.
 
She is perhaps better known for the role of Lady Pearl, the feisty wife of country music icon Haven Hamilton (Henry Gibson) in Robert Altman's film Nashville (1975) and as the mother of Sally Field's character in Norma Rae (1979).

Baxley was a close friend of musician Dave Brubeck and his wife; according to him, Baxley was more like a member of the family. He later confirmed that Baxley was a liberal Democrat, an atheist, a woman who always put the needs and well-being of others before her own self, and that when she died, he and his wife, Iola, not only handled her funeral arrangements but also buried her in the same cemetery next to their own plots so that they all could be together as one in death, same as in life, because their bond held such a strong connection.

Death
Baxley died at age 67 on June 7, 1990, at her home in Manhattan, New York, of an apparent heart attack. She is buried at Umpawaug Cemetery in Redding, Connecticut.

Filmography

References

External links

 Barbara Baxley Papers, 1911-1988, held by the Billy Rose Theatre Division, New York Public Library for the Performing Arts
 New York Public Library blog about Barbara Baxley and William Inge

1923 births
1990 deaths
20th-century American actresses
20th-century American singers
Actresses from California
American film actresses
American musical theatre actresses
American stage actresses
American television actresses
People from Porterville, California
20th-century American women singers
California Democrats
Connecticut Democrats
New York (state) Democrats
American atheists